Balor may refer to:

Balor, from Irish mythology
Balor (Dungeons & Dragons), a creature from Dungeons & Dragons
Finn Bálor,  an Irish professional wrestler